Maciek Sykut (born June 21, 1986) is an American professional tennis player. He competes mainly on the ATP Challenger Tour and ITF Futures, both in singles and doubles. He reached his highest ATP singles ranking, No. 578 on August 8, 2011, and his highest ATP doubles ranking, No. 158, on June 11, 2012.

Career finals (2)

Doubles (2)

References

External links

1986 births
Living people
American male tennis players
American people of Polish descent
Florida State Seminoles men's tennis players